Gene Walet III (born September 1, 1935) is an American sailor. He competed at the 1956 Summer Olympics and the 1960 Summer Olympics.

References

External links
 

1935 births
Living people
American male sailors (sport)
Olympic sailors of the United States
Sailors at the 1956 Summer Olympics – Dragon
Sailors at the 1960 Summer Olympics – Dragon
Sportspeople from New Orleans